Bull Head Lodge and Studio, located off Going-to-the-Sun Road near Apgar in Flathead County, Montana was listed on the National Register of Historic Places in 1984.

The lodge and studio are two contributing log buildings at the southern end of Lake McDonald in Glacier National Park.

The cabin named Bull Head Lodge was built in 1905 or 1906, on land purchased by Russell from Dimon Apgar.  The property was a private inholding within the Glacier National Park when it was formed in 1910. It was Charles M. Russell's summer home, where he hosted artist friends to paint and sketch landscapes and scenery of the park. Russell composed a number of gnomic sculptures using found objects such as wood and moss from the park.

See also 
 Charles M. Russell House and Studio: winter home also on the NRHP

References

National Register of Historic Places in Flathead County, Montana
National Register of Historic Places in Glacier National Park
Log buildings and structures on the National Register of Historic Places in Montana
Log cabins in the United States
Artists' studios in the United States
1900s establishments in Montana
Buildings and structures completed in the 1900s
Charles Marion Russell